Tangail formerly a small Mohokuma of Greater Mymensingh district is a district (zila) in the central region of Bangladesh. In 1969, Tangail district was created by Tangail Mohokuma from its 237 square kilometers of its land and 3177 square kilometers of land from Mymensingh district. It is the largest district of Dhaka division by area and second largest by population (after Dhaka district). The main city of the district is Tangail. It is surrounded by Jamalpur District on the north, the Dhaka and Manikganj Districts on the south, the Mymensingh and Gazipur on the east, and the Sirajganj on the west.

History

Tangail was a part of Greater Mymensingh till 1969. Tangail was separated from Mymensingh District in order to subdue its dominance. Before the 6 Upazila event, Mymensingh District had a greater economic growth rate than the capital, Dhaka. As the ruler believed, the greater economy cannot exist alongside capital. Greater Mymensingh was separated from Mymensingh's 6 out of 5 Upazila Tangail, Kishorganj, Sherpur, Jamalpur, and Netrokona (now known as District) in order to subdue Mymensingh. To prevent conflict with Dhaka, six sub-districts were elevated to district level. Thus the district of Tangail was formed. The main rivers that cross the Tangail district are the Jamuna, Dhaleshwari, Jhenai, Bangshi, Louhajang, Langulia, Elongjani, Jugni, Pouli, Fotikjani and the Turag.

Administration
The subdivision of Tangail was established in 1870. It was turned into a district on 1 December 1969. The district consists of 11 municipalities, 108 wards of these municipalities, 109 Union Parishads and 2516 villages.

Tangail district is subdivided into 12 Upazilas:
 Tangail Sadar Upazila
 Sakhipur Upazila
 Basail Upazila
 Madhupur Upazila
 Ghatail Upazila
 Kalihati Upazila
 Nagarpur Upazila
 Mirzapur Upazila
 Gopalpur Upazila
 Delduar Upazila
 Bhuapur Upazila
 Dhanbari Upazila

Demographics

According to the 2011 Bangladesh census, Tangail District had a population of 3,605,083, of which 1,757,370 were males and 1,847,713 were females. Rural population was 3,061,298 (84.92%) while urban population was 543,785 (15.08%). Tangail had a literacy rate 46.79% for the population 7 years and above: 50.01% for males and 43.77% for females.

Religion 

Muslims make up 92.72% and 6.83% are Hindus. There is a small population of Christians near Madhupur National Park, mainly Garo tribals.

Geography
The total area of the zila is 3414.28 km2 (1318.00 sq mi), of which 497.27 km2 (192.00 sq mi) is forested. The zila lies between 24° 01′ and 24° 47′ north latitudes and between 89° 44′ and 90° 18′ east longitudes.

Climate
Tangail has a tropical climate. In winter, there is much less rainfall than in summer. According to Köppen and Geiger, this climate is classified as Aw. The temperature here averages 25.5 °C. About 1872 mm of precipitation falls annually.

River system

Tangail district is flanked on the west by the Jamuna River, which is over 4 miles wide during the rainy season. The Dhaleswari, first an old channel of the Ganges and then of the Brahmaputra, cuts across the southwestern comer of the district on its powerful sweep to join the Meghna near Narayanganj. The old name of Dhaleswari was "Gajghata". It used to flow afterward by the
Salimabad channel and then at last by Porabari channel.

A part of the eastern boundary of the district runs close to the Banar river. The river Bangshi flows almost down the middle of the district, branching out from the old Brahmaputra to the north from near Jamalpur. Bangshi falls into Dhaleswari near Savar, in Dhaka district. The Bangshi forms a natural barrier to the Madhupur Jungle on the Tangail side, all the way from Madhupur to Mirzapur. It is only fordable at two or three places near Basail on its way to river Meghna. Dhaleswari itself, however, takes out from the Jamuna from inside Tangail district.

Among other important rivers of the district, Lohajang is worth mentioning. It flows past the district headquarters of Tangail and is almost dead at present (in moribund condition). Other rivers are Khiru, Nanglai Nadi, Atai, Elengjani, Fatikjani, Bairan and Jhinai. The old Brahmaputra's most important offshoot is the Jhinai; striking off near Jamalpur it rejoins the Jamuna north of Sarishabari, while another branch flows past Gopalpur. Now these subsystems of rivers, viz Bangshi and Banar, and the Lohajang, Khiru, Nangtai Nadi, Atia and Jhinai are dying out because of the shift of the old Brahmaputra river from its former channel to the present Jamuna channel.

Education
In Tangail, the average literacy rate as of the 2011 census was 47.8%; male 50%, female 43.8%.

Before the Liberation War, some educational institutions were established by notable persons of Tangail. Santosh Jahnnabi High School was established in 1870. It is the oldest school in Tangail and the second oldest in the greater Mymensingh district. Bindubasini Govt. Boys' High School was established. In 1880 and Bindubasini Govt Girls' High School was established in 1882. Both are in downtown, Tangail. These are nationally rewarded double shift schools.

In 1926, the Government Saadat University College was established by Wazed Ali Khan Panni, a zamindar and educationalist of Tangail. He named it after the name of his grandfather Saadat Ali Khan Panni. Govt. M.M. Ali College was established by Maulana Abdul Hamid Khan Bhasani at Kagmari (1 km from the main city) is one of the (First Govt. College) topmost colleges in Bangladesh. Kumudini College was established in 1943 by Ranada Prasad Saha (R.P. Saha), philanthropist of Tangail. He named it after his mother Kumudini. Later the college was converted into Kumudini Government Women's College. He also established Bharateswari Homes in 1945 at Mirzapur. He named it after his grandmother Bharateswari Devi. Mirzapur Cadet College, the third cadet college of Bangladesh, was established in 1963. The then president of Pakistan Field Marshal Ayub Khan took initiatives to establish this cadet college. The famous Neogi family of Tangail, till the time they left during Partition, contributed much to the spread of education, with other zamindar families like the Roy Chowdhuris and the Majumdars.

Currently, there are five government high schools in the city: Bindu Basini Govt. Boys' High School and Bindu Basini Govt. Girls' High School (established in 1880 and 1882 respectively by zamindar of Santosh—the famous Roy Chowdhury family who were co-founders of the East Bengal club of Calcutta), Shibnath High School, Vivekananda high school, Police Lines high school, Zilla Sadar girls' high school and Santosh Jannabi Govt. high school.

Tangail has 341 non-government high schools, 86 satellite schools, 5 government colleges, 48 non-government colleges, 3 university colleges, 1 textile engineering college, 1 medical college, 1 law college, 1 homoeopathy college, 1 textile institute,1 polytechnic institute, 1 Medical assistant training school, 2 nursing institutes, 1 police academy, 202 madrasas, 40 secondary schools (SSC), 941 government primary schools, 395 non-government primary schools, 1 teachers' training school, 146 community primary schools and 1304 NGO-operated schools. There is a technical university named Mawlana Bhashani Science and Technology University at Santosh, Tangail. A government  textile engineering college named Bangabandhu Textile Engineering College (BTEC) at Kalihati, Tangail established in 2007. A government medical college (Sheikh Hasina Medical College, Tangail) is located at Kodalia area of tangail sadar. Tangail medical college was established in 2014.

Urbanization

The urban growth rate of Tangail District is increasing as it is close to the capital of Bangladesh, Dhaka. There are 11 municipalities in Tangail District. Tangail municipality is planned to be converted into a City Corporation in next couple of years alongside 11 other old district headquarters of Bangladesh.

Economy 

Agriculture is the main occupation of the Tangail district. About 49.53% of people are involved with agricultural activities. Its main agricultural products are paddy, potato, jute, sugarcane, sesame, linseed, wheat, mustard seed and pulse. About  of cultivable lands are available in Tangail. The main fruit products are mangos, jackfruit, bananas, litchis, and pineapples. Other sectors, such as fisheries (446), dairies (189), industries, weaving and poultry farms (538) are developing in the Tangail district. Tangail is the home of the weavers of the world-famous "Tangail Saree".

Sarees

Tangail Saree a handloom saree made of cotton and silk thread having hand-worked butte design, all-over flowery design, or contemporary art motif is appreciated, bought, and used by women and girls of Bangladeshi and Indian origin all over the world. Tangail Saris are famous at home and abroad. Large numbers of sarees are sold on the occasion of Eid, Puja, Pahela Boishakh and wedding season between November and February. The weavers get orders from home and abroad. Tangail Sarees are produced in Tangail Sadar Upazila, Delduar Upazila and Kalihati Upazila. Pathrail in Delduar Upazila and Barabelta, Kabilapara (Porabari Union) in Sadar Upazila are famous for fine and expensive sarees.

A survey conducted in 2013 said there were 60,000 looms in Tangail. Of them, 8,305 are pit looms, 51,141 are Chittranjan looms and 892 are power looms. About  labourers, owners and traders are connected with the profession. The factories have been producing Tangail sarees worth Tk 300-Tk 20,000 apiece.

Industry

There are many industries growing rapidly in Gorai Industrial Area. These include Square Group, Nasir Glassware industry, Olympic Battery, North Bengal cycle industry, and Tangail Cotton mill. There are many garments and textiles in Gorai. BSCIC Tarotia also has some industries. Alauddin Textile mill is in Tangail.

Notable people 

 Rafiq Azad, poet and literary personality
Abu Sayeed Chowdhury, President of Bangladesh
 Muhammad Abdul Bari, physicist, former Secretary General Muslim Council of Britain
 Maulana Abdul Hamid Khan Bhashani, Islamic scholar and political leader
 Dr. Abdur Razzak MP, Agricultural Scientist, Minister of Agriculture(2019-), Food (2009-2013) and a Presidium Member of Bangladesh Awami League.
 Debapriya Bhattacharya, economist
 Abul Hasan Chowdhury, politician
 Qader "Tiger" Siddiqi, politician and Mukti Bahini
 Syed Hasan Ali Chowdhury, politician
 Syed Nawab Ali Chowdhury, politician
 Abdul Halim Ghaznavi, politician
 M Farid Habib, chief of Bangladesh Navy
 Shamsul Huq, politician, first General Secretary of Awami League
 Abdur Rahman Khan, Cabinet Minister
 Ibrahim Khan, litterateur
 Abdul Mannan, politician
 Krishna Rani, footballer
 Maj General (Rtd.) Mahmudul Hasan, politician
 Ranadaprasad Saha,  businessman and philanthropist
Fazlur Rahman Faruque, politician and Ekushey Padak award recipients

Members of tenth Jatiyo Sangsad (2014–present)
The members of the national parliament are:
 Tangail-1 Seat 130: Abdur Razzak from Awami League
 Tangail-2 Seat 131: Soto Monir from Awami League
 Tangail-3 Seat 132: Amanur Rahman Khan Rana from Awami League * Present day : Ataur Rahman Khan from Awami League
 Tangail-4 Seat 133: Hasan Imam khan Sohel Hazari from Awami League
 Tangail-5 Seat 134: Md. Sanowar Hossain from Awami League
 Tangail-6 Seat 135: Ahasanul Islam Titu from Awami League
 Tangail-7 Seat 136: Md. Akabbar Hossain from Awami League; Abul-Kalam Azad Siddique, former cabinet member of national parliament
 Tangail-8 Seat 137: Zoherul Islam from Awami League

See also
 Tangail Airdrop by the Indian Army in 1971
 Tangail Airport
 Atia Mosque
 Tangail Railway Station
 Tangail Stadium
 P. C. Sorcar magician who born in Tangail & known as the father of modern Indian magic.

Notes

References

 
Districts of Bangladesh
Districts of Bangladesh established before 1971
1969 establishments in East Pakistan